Adrian R. Morrison was the 1991 AAAS Scientific Freedom and Responsibility Award recipient.

Education
Morrison has a BA from Franklin and Marshall College, a DVM and a Masters from Cornell University, and a PhD from the University of Pennsylvania. He completed his Postdoctoral training at the University of Pisa’s Institute of Physiology, as well as in the Department of Anatomy at the School of Veterinary Medicine at the University of Pennsylvania.

Honors
Morrison has: a Phi Beta Kappa (Franklin and Marshall College), a Phi Zeta (New York State College of Veterinary Medicine) and received a John Simon Guggenheim Fellowship.  Awards in the 1990s he received include: a MERIT Award (National Institute of Mental Health), the Director's Award of the David Mahoney Institute of Neurological Sciences, the 1991 AAAS Award, the Distinguished Service Award for the Society for Neuroscience and the Incurably Ill for Animal Research’s Rick Simpson Memorial Award. In 2002 he received the Distinguished Scientist Award from the Sleep Research Society.  2013 saw the launch of the Adrian R. Morrison Lectureship hosted by the Center for Sleep and Circadian Neurobiology.

Awards
He received the AAAS award  “for his dedicated promotion of the responsible use of animals in research and his courageous stand in the face of great personal risk against attempts to curtail animal research essential to public health.”

He also received the 1972–73 Bing Travel Award from the National Academy of Sciences.

Appointments
From 2001 to 2003, Morrison was the president at the World Federation of Sleep Research Societies.  In 1991 he held the role of visiting professorship at London's Royal Society of Medicine. Other roles throughout the years he has held include: professor of anatomy, Laboratories of Anatomy, at the Department of Animal Biology, School of Veterinary Medicine, an associate director at the NIHBL Specialized Center of Research on Basic Mechanisms of Cardiopulmonary Disorders during Sleep, professor of behavioral neuroscience, Laboratories of Anatomy, Department of Animal Biology, School of Veterinary Medicine, professor of behavioral neuroscience in psychiatry, adjunct professor of psychiatry and behavioral sciences, The George Washington University School of Medicine and Health Sciences, senior research fellow, Center on Neuroscience, Medical Progress and Society, George Washington University and Medical Center, Washington, D.C.

Morrison was a collaborator at the: Unit for Experimental Psychiatry, The Institute of Pennsylvania Hospital, and in the Graduate Group in Anatomy, and the Graduate Group in Comparative Medical Sciences.

Boards
Morrison was a consultant and member of the Institute of Neurological Sciences, University of Pennsylvania, a member of the executive board at the Human Clinical Sleep Research Center, was on the executive committee and advisory board, Center for Sleep and Respiratory Neurobiology, and the executive committee of the Penn Sleep Academic Award (NIH Program). He also chaired the advisory board of the Center for Sleep and Circadian Neurobiology.

In addition to these roles Morrison is: the chairman of the Sleep Home Pages Board of Governors, sits on the Environmental Economists Advisory Council to The National Center for Public Policy Research and is on the External Scientific Advisory Board for the Air Force Office of Scientific Research PRET Center on Countermeasures for Jet Lag and Sleep Deprivation.

Publications
Morrison co-edited: Changing Concepts of the Nervous System (Academic Press, NY), Brain Mechanisms of Sleep (Raven Press), Progress in Psychobiology and Physiological Psychology (Academic Press, NY), Progress in Psychobiology and Physiological Psychology (Academic Press, San Diego, Vol. 16 and Vol. 17), An analysis of the animal rights movement: its thinking, methods and successes. Progress in Psychobiology and Physiological Psychology (Academic Press, San Diego, Vol. 18). He co-wrote: A. R. Habel's Guide to the Dissection of Domestic Ruminants (self-published with co-author P.G. Orsini).

Scholarships
Morrison received a wide array of scholarships including: the Franklin and Marshall District Scholarship, the Valentine Mott Knapp Scholarship, the New York State College of Veterinary Medicine – a Postdoctoral Traineeship from the Institute of Neurological Sciences, and a Special Fellowship of the National Institutes of Health.

Personal data
Born in Philadelphia, Pennsylvania, today Adrian is married to Olive R. Morrison. The couple has five children.

References

American neuroscientists
Sleep researchers
Scientists from Philadelphia
Cornell University College of Veterinary Medicine alumni
University of Pennsylvania alumni
Franklin & Marshall College alumni
Living people
Year of birth missing (living people)